Jaguar R and R-S/SVR models are a range of high performance versions of certain car models from the British automotive marque Jaguar Cars, part of parent business Jaguar Land Rover. These cars primarily focus on enhanced "sport" performance. Jaguar began producing R models in 1995 with the introduction of the first XJR, and began producing R-S models in limited production numbers and input from Jaguar SVO (Special Vehicle Operations) with the introduction of the 2012 XKR-S. The R-S mark has since been replaced by the SVR (Special Vehicle Racing) designation, which was first introduced on the 2017 Jaguar F-Type SVR, effectively making the XFR-S the last Jaguar SVO car not to carry the SVR moniker.

History 
The 1995 XJR was powered by a supercharged 6-cylinder engine, the car produced approximately 322 horsepower. With the revamped line of engines, the powerplant would be based on an eight-cylinder engine with supercharger from 1997 to present. Starting after year 2000, XJRs were equipped with Jaguar's CATS (Computer Active Technology Suspension), which helped firm up the ride in sporty driving without compromising comfort during day-to-day use.

The S-Type R had a short production run from 2003 to 2008, and came equipped with the same  supercharged V8 as the other R models. It was replaced by the XFR, featuring a 5.0 L supercharged V8 producing  R-S models were then added to the line up starting with the XKR-S in 2012 and later in 2014, the XFR-S. Both these cars produced 550bhp, boasting zero to sixty times of sub 4 seconds. With the introduction of the F Type R some two years later, the then-to-be called Jaguar F-Type R-S was renamed the F-Type SVR along with the all future special vehicle operation (SVO) vehicles within the lineup.

Models 
 Jaguar XFR   mid-size saloon
 Jaguar XKR   coupé and cabriolet
 Jaguar XFR-S   mid-size saloon
 Jaguar XKR-S   coupé and cabriolet
 Jaguar XJR575   full-size saloon
 Jaguar F-Type R   coupé
 Jaguar F-Type SVR   coupé
 Jaguar F-Pace SVR   SUV
 Jaguar XE SVR   sedan
 Jaguar XE R-Sport  sedan

S Models 
Jaguar offers an "S" variant on many of their vehicles, which includes sportier styling on both the exterior and interior, more horsepower, and a firmer suspension.

References

External links

Jaguar Cars
Land Rover
Official motorsports and performance division of automakers